Aloe × nobilis is a commonly cultivated hybrid aloe in the family Asphodelaceae. It is an artificial hybrid, possibly between Aloe mitriformis and Aloe brevifolia.

History
Aloe × nobilis was described in 1812 by Adrian Hardy Haworth. Although both parent species are South African, it likely emerged from crosses between cultivated plants in Europe, as it has not been found in the wild in South Africa.

It is one of the most commonly cultivated aloes in Europe, and has become naturalised in parts of Portugal.

References

Aloe
Plants described in 1812
Hybrid plants